Martín Morello (born 13 June 1983 in San Pedro, Buenos Aires) is an Argentine footballer currently playing for River Plate Puerto Rico in the USL Professional Division.

External links
 Apertura 2005 Statistics at Terra.com.ar 
 

1983 births
Living people
Sportspeople from Buenos Aires Province
Argentine footballers
Association football midfielders
Club Atlético Independiente footballers
Club Atlético Platense footballers
SD Ponferradina players
Argentine Primera División players
Argentine expatriate footballers
Expatriate footballers in Colombia
Club Atlético River Plate Puerto Rico players
USL Championship players